x Centauri can refer to two different stars:

 x1 Centauri, HR 4712
 x2 Centauri, HR 4724

They are not to be confused with χ Centauri (Chi Centauri).

Centaurus (constellation)
Centauri, x